Strike (also known as C. B. Strike internationally) is a British crime drama television programme based on the book series Cormoran Strike by J. K. Rowling under the pseudonym Robert Galbraith. The programme was first broadcast on BBC One on 27 August 2017, after receiving an advance premiere at the British Film Institute on 10 August 2017.

The programme follows Cormoran Strike (Tom Burke), a war veteran turned private detective operating out of a tiny office in London's Denmark Street, who uses his unique insight and his background as a Special Investigation Branch investigator to solve complex cases that have eluded the police along with his assistant, subsequently business partner, Robin Ellacott (Holliday Grainger).

Fifteen episodes across five series have been broadcast to date, each series adapting the novels The Cuckoo's Calling (2013), The Silkworm (2014), Career of Evil (2015), Lethal White (2018), and Troubled Blood (2020), respectively.

The programme premiered on 1 June 2018 in the United States on Cinemax and in Canada on HBO Canada. Following the fourth series, the programme was exhibited in the United States on HBO.

Cast and characters

Main cast
 Tom Burke as Cormoran Blue Strike
 Holliday Grainger as Robin Venetia Ellacott

Recurring cast
 Kerr Logan as Matthew Cunliffe
 Ben Crompton as "Shanker"
 Natasha O'Keeffe as Charlotte Campbell
 Killian Scott as D.I. Eric Wardle
 Ann Akin as Vanessa Ekwensi
 Sargon Yelda as D.I. Richard Anstis
 Caitlin Innes Edwards as Ilsa Herbert
 Jack Greenlees as Sam Barclay

Guest cast

S1: The Cuckoo's Calling
 Siân Phillips as Lady Yvette Bristow
 Martin Shaw as Tony Landry
 David Avery as Nico Kolovas-Jones
 Leo Bill as John Bristow
 Tara Fitzgerald as Tansy Bestigui
 Amber Anderson as Ciara Porter
 Kadiff Kirwan as Guy Somé
 Bronson Webb as Evan Duffield
 Elarica Johnson as Lula Landry
 Brian Bovell as Derrick Wilson

S2: The Silkworm
 Dorothy Atkinson as Kathryn Kent
 Monica Dolan as Leonora Quine
 Dominic Mafham as Jerry Waldegrave
 Tim McInnerny as Daniel Chard
 Peter Sullivan as Andrew Fancourt
 Jeremy Swift as Owen Quine
 Lia Williams as Liz Tassel
 Sarah Gordy as Orlando Quine

S3: Career of Evil
 Andrew Brooke as Niall Brockbank
 Emmanuella Cole as Alyssa
 Jessica Gunning as Holly Brockbank
 Matt King as Jeff Whittaker
 Neil Maskell as Donald Laing
 Kierston Wareing as Leda Strike

S4: Lethal White
 Nick Blood as Jimmy Knight
 Robert Glenister as Jasper Chiswell
 Joseph Quinn as Billy Knight
 Sophie Winkleman as Kinvara Chiswell
 Christina Cole as Izzy Chiswell
 Adam Long as Raff Chiswell
 Natalie Gumede as Lorelei Bevan
 Saffron Coomber as Flick Pardue
 Danny Ashok as Aamir Malik
 Robert Pugh as Geraint Winn

S5: Troubled Blood
 Jonas Armstrong as Saul Morris
 Linda Bassett as Joan Nancarrow
 Fionnula Flanagan as Oonagh Kennedy
 Sutara Gayle as Kim Sullivan
 Abigail Lawrie as Margot Bamborough
 Ian Redford as Ted Nancarrow 
 Ruth Sheen as Pat Chauncey
 Andy de la Tour as Nico 'Mucky' Ricci
 Sophie Ward as Anna Phipps
 Kierston Wareing as Leda Strike
 Michael Byrne as Roy Phipps
 Anna Calder-Marshall as Janice Beattie
 Cherie Lunghi as Gloria Conti
 Carol MacReady as Irene Hickson
 Madhav Sharma as Dr. Dinesh Gupta

Production and development
On 10 December 2014, it was announced that the Cormoran Strike novel series, written by J. K. Rowling under the pseudonym Robert Galbraith, would be adapted for television by the BBC, for broadcast on BBC One, beginning with The Cuckoo's Calling. Two years later, it was confirmed that the series would total seven episodes of sixty minutes, with shooting to begin in London in the autumn of 2016. Tom Burke was announced in the role of Cormoran Strike in September 2016, while Holliday Grainger was announced in the role of Robin Ellacott in November 2016.

Ben Richards adapted The Cuckoo's Calling, and Tom Edge adapted The Silkworm, Career of Evil, Lethal White and Troubled Blood. Richards stated that the series is "very different tonally and visually from other crime dramas". He compared Strike to the British detective television show Morse. Similarly, Edge commented that "people use old-fashioned as a pejorative word, but to me that's part of why these books, and, I hope, the TV series, works so well."

Episodes

Series 1: The Cuckoo's Calling (2017)
The Cuckoo's Calling was released on DVD on 27 November 2017.

Series 2: The Silkworm (2017)
The Silkworm was released on DVD on 19 February 2018.

Series 3: Career of Evil (2018)
Career of Evil was released on DVD on 16 April 2018.

Series 4: Lethal White (2020)
Lethal White was released on DVD on 23 November 2020.

Series 5: Troubled Blood (2022)

Reception
The Cuckoo's Calling received generally positive reviews from critics. Rotten Tomatoes gave it an approval rating of 85%, based on 20 reviews, and an average score of 6.8/10. The website's critics consensus reads "The TV adaptation of C. B. Strike delivers an entertaining detective series that faithfully and effectively adheres to genre tropes." Morgan Jeffery of Digital Spy, who reviewed the first episode, praised both Burke and Grainger's performances, calling Burke's performance a "revelation".

Similarly, the adaptation of The Silkworm was met with positive reviews, with critics again praising Burke and Grainger's performances. However, the first episode was criticised for showing a suicide scene on World Suicide Prevention Day, making some viewers claim that this scene was insensitive.

Career of Evil holds an 88% approval rating on Rotten Tomatoes, based on 8 reviews, and an average score of 7/10.

Lethal White holds a 73% approval rating on Rotten Tomatoes, based on 11 reviews, and an average score of 5.6/10.

References

External links

2017 British television series debuts
2010s British crime drama television series
2010s British mystery television series
2010s British television miniseries
2020s British crime drama television series
2020s British mystery television series
2020s British television miniseries
Adaptations of works by J. K. Rowling
BBC high definition shows
BBC crime television shows
BBC mystery television shows
BBC television dramas
British detective television series
English-language television shows
Television shows based on British novels
Television shows set in London
Cinemax original programming